The Massawa Circuit is a cycling race held annually in Massawa, Eritrea since 2016. It is rated 1.2 and is part of UCI Africa Tour.

Winners

References

Cycle races in Eritrea
Recurring sporting events established in 2016
UCI Africa Tour races